Terry Fox station is a bus stop on Ottawa, Ontario, Canada's transitway served by OC Transpo buses and named after cancer research activist Terry Fox. It is located in the western transitway section and is the main western terminal of routes 61 and 62 for all trips not extended to/from Stittsville.

It is located adjacent the Kanata Centrum shopping centre at Kanata Avenue and Earl Grey Drive, just east of the Highway 417 exit at Terry Fox Drive. The station entered service in September 2004 with construction still having been underway at that time; it officially opened on February 22, 2005. Before the station's construction, a small terminal was located at Kanata Town Centre, located south of Highway 417 on Katimavik Road.

The station was needed as the Kanata Centrum was getting more and more popular, while the Kanata Town Centre was desolate for several years. Previously, service to Centrum was very limited, but the construction of the Castlefrank Road/Kanata Avenue interchange and Valour Bridge overpass over Highway 417 have permitted for several bus routes to serve the Centrum.

The station also contains a Park & Ride facility to supplement the often-full Eagleson station.

As of April 23, 2017, route 96 is renumbered and re-branded as Rapid Route 61, and similarly route 92 is Rapid Route 62. Both operate with their respective previous routings (route 61 on Hazeldean, Castlefrank, and Katimavik; route 62 on Huntmar, Palladium, and Campeau) to/from downtown and St-Laurent. Route 118 is also being re-numbered to route 88 at this time, also with no change in routing.

Service

The following routes serve Terry Fox station:

See also
 OC Transpo
 OC Transpo routes
 Ottawa Rapid Transit
 Kanata, Ontario

References

External links
 Terry Fox Station Page
 Terry Fox Station Area Map

Terry Fox
Transitway (Ottawa) stations